Pinus tropicalis, the tropical pine, is a pine tree endemic to the western highlands of the island of Cuba.

See also
Cuban pine forests

References

 

Endemic flora of Cuba
Least concern plants
tropicalis
Trees of Cuba